Édgar Milciades Benítez Santander (born 8 November 1987), nicknamed Pájaro (bird), is a Paraguayan footballer who plays as a midfielder for Alianza Lima. He also holds Mexican citizenship. A Paraguayan international on 56 occasions since 2008, he represented for his country FIFA World Cup 2010 and two Copa América tournaments. In 2006, he won the Milk Cup with Paraguay's under-20 team.

Career

Club
Benítez started his career in Club 12 de Octubre of Itaugua before moving to Libertad in 2005, where he won the Paraguayan 1st division tournament although he mostly played as a substitute. In 2008, he was signed by Sol de América and quickly established himself in the club, being one of the team's top goalscorers.

On 1 December 2008, it was announced that Benítez will play in the Mexican League for Pachuca CF. He made his debut with C.F. Pachuca on 2 January in the Interliga 2009, scoring his first goal with the club in the 4–0 win over Tecos UAG. He would end the tournament as the top goalscorer with 4 goals in 4 games, helping Pachuca obtain a spot in the qualifying round for the Copa Libertadores 2009.

Since 2009 he wasn't considered as a starter for Pachuca. He is mainly used as a substitute for every match. He has participated constantly in Pachuca's matches in Bicentenario 2010. On 20 February 2010 he started a match against Chiapas. He scored twice in this game and Pachuca secured a 2–2. In June, 2015, Queretaro announced that Benítez would play for them for the upcoming season.

National team
In the 2006 Milk Cup, he scored in the 60th minute in a 2–0 victory over the USA.

He played first international match in 2008. Due to his good performances with Sol de América he was called for the Paraguay national football team and had a good debut, playing in his first 2010 World Cup qualification match against Peru in which Paraguay won 1–0.

He was included in Paraguay's squad for the 2015 Copa América, scoring the only goal of a 1–0 win against Jamaica in the team's second group match on 16 June 2015.

He scored the second goal for Paraguay in a 2–2 draw against Brazil for the nation's campaign to qualify for the 2018 FIFA World Cup in Russia.

International goals
Updated 29 March 2016

Honours
Alianza Lima
 Peruvian Primera División: 2021, 2022
 Peruvian Torneo Clausura: 2021

Libertad
Paraguayan Primera División: 2006, 2007

Pachuca
CONCACAF Champions League: 2009–10

Cerro Porteño
Paraguayan Primera División: 2012 Apertura

Querétaro
Copa MX: Apertura 2016
Supercopa MX: 2017

References

External links

1987 births
Living people
Paraguayan footballers
Paraguayan expatriate footballers
Club Libertad footballers
Club Sol de América footballers
C.F. Pachuca players
Deportivo Toluca F.C. players
Cerro Porteño players
Querétaro F.C. footballers
Club Guaraní players
Paraguayan Primera División players
Liga MX players
Paraguay international footballers
2010 FIFA World Cup players
2015 Copa América players
Copa América Centenario players
Paraguay under-20 international footballers
People from Caaguazú Department
Association football forwards
Naturalized citizens of Mexico
Expatriate footballers in Mexico
Expatriate footballers in Peru
Paraguayan expatriate sportspeople in Mexico
Paraguayan expatriate sportspeople in Peru